Sidney Brazier, GM (8 December 1919 – 12 May 2016) was a British Army bomb disposal officer who won a George Medal for defusing sticky bombs when he was a conductor in the Royal Army Ordnance Corps in 1963.

References

1919 births
2016 deaths
Bomb disposal personnel
British Army personnel of the Korean War
British military personnel of the Cyprus Emergency
British military personnel of The Troubles (Northern Ireland)
People educated at Rotherham Grammar School
People from Rotherham
Royal Army Ordnance Corps officers
Recipients of the George Medal
Military personnel from Yorkshire
British Army personnel of World War II